A frequency plan, bandplan, band plan or wavelength plan is a plan for using a particular band of radio frequencies, that are a portion of the electromagnetic spectrum. Each frequency plan defines the frequency range to be included, how channels are to be defined, and what will be carried on those channels.  Typical definitions set forth in a frequency plan are:

numbering scheme – which channel numbers or letters (if any) will be assigned
center frequencies – how far apart the carrier wave for each channel will be
bandwidth and/or deviation – how wide each channel will be
spectral mask – how extraneous signals will be attenuated by frequency
modulation – what type will be used or are permissible
content – what types of information are allowed, such as audio or video, analog or digital
licensing – what the procedure will be to obtain a broadcast license

The actual authorized frequency bands are defined by the ITU and the local regulating agencies like the US Federal Communications Commission (FCC)  and voluntary best practices help avoid interference.

Notes

See also
Geneva Frequency Plan of 1975
Copenhagen Frequency Plan of 1948
AM broadcasting
Amateur radio frequency allocations
Broadcasting
Cellular frequencies
FM broadcast band
Frequency allocation
Ham radio
Radio broadcasting

 
Amateur radio
Broadcast engineering
Radio resource management